Nawadih Airfield is a former wartime United States Army Air Forces airfield in India used during the Burma Campaign 1944-1945.  It is now abandoned.

History
The airfield was the temporary home of the 311th Fighter Group during September and October 1943 prior to its moving east into West Bengal and closer to the front lines in Burma.   It remained open as a combat communications radio relay facility and C-46 Commando and C-47 Skytrain transport airfield until 15 September 1945 when it was closed.

References

 Maurer, Maurer. Air Force Combat Units Of World War II. Maxwell Air Force Base, Alabama: Office of Air Force History, 1983. 
  www.pacificwrecks.com - Pandaveswar keyword search

External links

Airfields of the United States Army Air Forces in British India
Defunct airports in India
Airports in Jharkhand
Airports established in 1944
20th-century architecture in India